Berendtia  is a genus of tropical air-breathing land snails, a pulmonate gastropod mollusks in the family Bulimulidae.

Species 
Species within the genus Berendtia  include:
 Berendtia minorina Mabille, 1895
 Berendtia taylori (L. Pfeiffer, 1861)

Distribution

References

 Bank, R. A. (2017). Classification of the Recent terrestrial Gastropoda of the World. Last update: July 16, 2017

External links 
 

Bulimulidae